The Fall of the House of Usher is a 1950 British horror film directed by Ivan Barnett and starring Gwendoline Watford, Kaye Tendeter and Irving Steen. It is an adaptation of the 1839 short story of the same title by Edgar Allan Poe.

Synopsis
The film uses a framing device set in a Gentlemen's club where one of the members reads to his friends from a copy of Poe's book. A century before, a young man visits a bleak-looking mansion in the English countryside where his friend Lord Roderick Usher lives with his sister Madeline. They are both mysteriously ill and he discovers that they are suffering from a curse brought on them by their father which will cause them both to die shortly, leading to the downfall of the ancient family of Usher.

Production and release
The film was made in Hastings by a low-budget company GIB Films. Ivan Barnett produced the film and also worked as director and cinematographer. The film was made in 1948, but it wasn't released until 1950. It was issued an 'H' Certificate, a rarity at the time, by the British Board of Film Censors. Despite its limited budget the film proved surprisingly successful on its release as a second feature and even topped the bill in some cinemas. It was reissued in 1955 and again in 1961. It may have been an influence on the subsequent development of Hammer Horror.

Cast
 Gwendoline Watford as Lady Usher  
 Kaye Tendeter as Lord Roderick Usher 
 Irving Steen as Jonathan 
 Vernon Charles as Dr. Cordwall 
 Connie Goodwin as Louise
 Gavin Lee as The Butler  
 Keith Lorraine as George 
 Lucy Pavey as The Hag 
 Tony Powell-Bristow as Richard 
 Robert Woolard as Greville

References

Bibliography
 Chibnall, Steve & McFarlane, Brian. The British 'B' Film. Palgrave MacMillan, 2009.
 Harper, Sue. Picturing the Past: The Rise and Fall of the British Costume Film. British Film Institute, 1994.

External links

1950 films
British historical horror films
1950s historical horror films
British black-and-white films
1950 horror films
Films based on The Fall of the House of Usher
Films shot in England
Films set in England
1950s English-language films
1950s British films